G. L. DiVittorio (born 18 July 1995) is a writer, comedian, and political commentator. She posted a viral video about the dating app Hinge, and she created The Pocket Report, a satirical news web series focused on American politics.

Her tweet "Do rich people know climate change will end their ski trips? Have we emphasized that angle?" is cited as an example of sarcasm in a 2022 academic journal article titled "Twitter Users’ Displays of Affect in the Global Warming Debate".

References 

1995 births
Living people
American women writers
American women comedians
American political commentators
Women satirists
American satirists
Marquette University alumni
American people of Italian descent